The 2010 AIBA Women World Boxing Championships was an international women's boxing competition hosted by Barbados from September 9 to 18, 2010 in Bridgetown. It was the 6th edition of the championship, which debuted in 2001 in Scranton, Pennsylvania, United States.

The World Championship was contested in 10 weight disciplines by 257 amateur women boxers from 66 federations, and was conducted in the Garfield Sobers Gymnasium.

Russia won two gold medals and one silver, while China, the champion in the 2008 edition, finished second with one gold, three silver and three bronze medals, followed by North Korea with one gold and one silver. In all, nine federations provided champions.

Participating federations

Results

Medal count table

Notes

External links
6th AIBA Women World Boxing Championships Barbados 2010
Results

Boxing
Boxing
Women's World Boxing Championships
2010 in women's boxing